Drawno  is a town in Choszczno County, West Pomeranian Voivodeship, Poland, with 2,219 inhabitants as of December 2021. The headquarters of the Drawa National Park (Drawieński Park Narodowy) are located here.

History

In the 10th-11th centuries, using the suitable location between two lakes, a Slavic gród and a fishing village were established here. The settlement was a part of Poland during the reign of the first Polish rulers Mieszko I and Bolesław I the Brave. In different periods in the Middle Ages it was a part of Pomerania or Greater Poland. In the 13th century Drawno was part of the Duchy of Greater Poland, a province of fragmented Poland.

Town rights were granted between 1313 and 1333. From 1373 Drawno was part of the Lands of the Bohemian Crown (or Czech Lands), ruled by the Luxembourg dynasty. In 1402, the Luxembourgs reached an agreement with Poland in Kraków. Poland was to buy and re-incorporate Drawno and its surroundings, but eventually the Luxembourgs sold the city to the Teutonic Order. During the Polish–Teutonic War (1431–35) Drawno rebelled against the Order to join Poland and recognized the Polish King as rightful ruler, but after the Peace of Brześć Kujawski, the town, after receiving a guarantee of impunity for siding with Poland, returned to the rule of the Teutonic Knights, although, as it turned out, for a short time - only until 1454.

The medieval castle was rebuilt in Renaissance style around 1600, but later on it was destroyed in the 17th and 18th century wars.

Between 1871 and 1945 the area was part of Germany.

Gallery

Notable residents
 Erich Rüdiger von Wedel (1892–1954), German World War I flying ace

References

External links
 Official town webpage
 Jewish Community in Drawno on Virtual Shtetl

Cities and towns in West Pomeranian Voivodeship
Choszczno County